Ayala (Basque: Aiara) is a toponymic surname, originally de Ayala (of Ayala), deriving from the town of Ayala/Aiara in the province of Álava, in the Basque Country, northern Spain.

It is linguistically unrelated to the Hebrew female given name Ayala, which is of Biblical origin.

Arts and entertainment
 Alexis Ayala (born 1965), American-born Mexican actor
 Cristina Ayala (1856–1936), pen name of Cuban poet Maria Cristina Fragas
 Francisco Ayala (novelist) (1906–2009), novelist
 Joey Ayala (born 1956), Filipino musician
 Josefa de Ayala ( – 1684), Spanish-born Portuguese painter
 Pedro Ayala (1911–1990), American accordionist
 Ramon Ayala (accordion player), (born 1928) Mexican accordion player
 Ramón Ayala (Argentine musician), (born 1937) Argentine singer and poet  
 Ramón Ayala Rodríguez (born 1976), Puerto Rican musician known as Daddy Yankee
 Vanessa Ayala, Colombian-American artist
 Violeta Ayala (born 1978), filmmaker and writer

Politics
 Eligio Ayala (1879–1930), President of Paraguay 1923–1924
 Eusebio Ayala (1875–1942), President of Paraguay 1921–1923
 Inés Ayala (born 1957), Spanish politician
 Paulina Ayala (born 1962), Canadian politician

Sports
 Bobby Ayala (born 1969), Major League pitcher
 Celso Ayala (born 1970), Paraguayan soccer player
 Daniel Sánchez Ayala (born 1990), Spanish soccer player
 Diego Ayala (footballer) (born 1990), Paraguayan footballer
 Diego Ayala (tennis) (born 1979), American tennis player
 Eric Ayala (born 1999), Puerto Rican basketball player
 Hercules Ayala (1950–2020), Puerto Rican wrestler
 Josué Ayala (born 1988), Argentine footballer
 Lucas Ayala (born 1978), Argentine footballer
 Luis Ayala (baseball) (born 1978), American-Mexican baseball pitcher 
 Luis Ayala (tennis) (born 1932), Chilean professional tennis player 
 Paulie Ayala (born 1970), Mexican-American former boxer
 Ramón Ayala (judoka), (born 1979) Puerto Rican judoka
 Roberto Ayala (born 1973), Argentine international footballer
 Rubén Ayala (born 1950), Argentine retired footballer
 Tony Ayala Jr. (1963–2015), former middleweight boxer

Other
 Aramis Ayala (born 1975), American attorney
 Carlos Ayala Vargas (born 1980), leader of the Spanish Pirate Party
 Francisco J. Ayala (1934-1923), Spanish-American biologist and philosopher

See also
 De Ayala, another surname
 Ayala (disambiguation)

References

Basque-language surnames